This is an incomplete list of presidents pro tempore of the Senate of Liberia. The Senate elects a president pro tempore to preside for a term of six years.

References

Politics of Liberia
Liberia
Liberia
Presidents pro tempore of the Senate of Liberia